Acetophenone carboxylase is an enzyme with systematic name acetophenone:carbon-dioxide ligase (ADP-forming). This enzyme catalyses the following chemical reaction

 2 ATP + acetophenone + HCO3− + H2O + H+  2 ADP + 2 phosphate + 3-oxo-3-phenylpropanoate

The enzyme is involved in anaerobic degradation of ethylbenzene.

References

External links 
 

EC 6.4.1